Etne is a municipality in Vestland county, Norway. It is located in the traditional district of Sunnhordland, although it is also sometimes considered to be part of the district of Haugaland. The administrative centre of the municipality is the village of Etnesjøen. Other villages in the municipality include Skånevik and Fjæra. The two largest villages in the municipality are Etnesjøen with 1,159 residents and Skånevik with 594 residents (all figures from 1 January 2015).

The  municipality is the 154th largest by area out of the 356 municipalities in Norway. Etne is the 201st most populous municipality in Norway with a population of 4,043.

Etne is situated south of the city of Bergen and it borders the municipalities of Kvinnherad, Ullensvang, Sauda, Suldal, and Vindafjord, the latter three are located in the neighboring county of Rogaland.

A Norwegian motion picture called United was shot in Etne with local people as actors.

General information

Etne was established as a municipality on 1 January 1838 (see formannskapsdistrikt law). Originally, Etne encompassed the area around the Etnefjorden and the surrounding valleys. During the 1960s, there were many municipal mergers across Norway due to the work of the Schei Committee. On 1 January 1965, the neighboring municipality of Skånevik was dissolved and merged into its neighboring municipalities. All of Skånevik located south of the Åkrafjorden and east of the village of Åkra on the north side of the fjord (population: 1,493) was merged into Etne.

Name
The municipality is named after the Etnefjorden. The fjord is probably named after an old river name Etna (now called the "Etneelvi").

Coat of arms
The coat of arms was granted on 16 December 1983. The arms are blue on the left and silver/white on the right with a dovetailed line vertically down the middle. They represent the strong unity between the two former municipalities of Skånevik and Etne that were joined to form one municipality in 1965.

Churches
The Church of Norway has two parishes within the municipality of Etne. It is part of the Sunnhordland prosti (deanery) in the Diocese of Bjørgvin.

Geography
{{Historical populations
|footnote = Source: Statistics Norway.
|shading = off
|1951|2452
|1960|2512
|1970|3930
|1980|3980
|1990|4037
|2000|3917
|2010|3882
|2019|4077
}}
Etne is situated south of the city of Bergen and it borders the municipalities of Kvinnherad and Ullensvang in Vestland county and the municipalities of Sauda, Suldal, and Vindafjord in Rogaland county.

Etne has a varied landscape, extending from the Etnefjorden, Skånevikfjorden, and Åkrafjorden at sea level, through the villages up to the high mountains. Folgefonna National Park is partially located in Etne. In addition to that national park, Etne has three nature reserves:  Brattholmen, Skåno, and Langebudalen. Lakes in the area include Løkjelsvatnet. The famous waterfall Langfossen is located in northern Etne.

History
Recent archeological findings indicate that the area was already inhabited around 500 BC.

Government
All municipalities in Norway, including Etne, are responsible for primary education (through 10th grade), outpatient health services, senior citizen services, unemployment and other social services, zoning, economic development, and municipal roads. The municipality is governed by a municipal council of elected representatives, which in turn elect a mayor.  The municipality falls under the Haugaland og Sunnhordland District Court and the Gulating Court of Appeal.

Municipal council
The municipal council of Etne is made up of 17 representatives that are elected to four year terms. The party breakdown of the council is as follows:

Mayor
The mayors of Etne (incomplete list):
2019–present: Mette Heidi Bergsvåg Ekrheim (Sp)
2015-2019: Siri Klokkerstuen (Ap)
2007-2015: Sigve Sørheim (Sp)
2000-2007: Amund Enge  (H)

Transportation
The European route E134 highway runs the length of the municipality connecting it to the city of Haugesund in the southwest and to Oslo in the east. The highway runs through Etnesjøen and then northeastwards along the Åkrafjorden before crossing into the neighboring municipality of Odda. There are many tunnels along the route, some quite long, including the Åkrafjord Tunnel, Fjæra Tunnel, Markhus Tunnel, and Rullestad Tunnel.

The Eintveitbrua is a bridge in rural Etne that is not connected to the road network. It is considered to be a bridge to nowhere.

Notable residents

 Erling Skakke (1115 at Etne – 1179) a Norwegian Jarl (Earl) during the 12th century
 Magnus V of Norway (1156 at Etne – 1184) King during the Civil war era in Norway
 Jacob Børretzen (1900 in Etne – 1989) a Norwegian hymnwriter and linguist
 Ingvar Moe (1936 in Etne - 1993) a Norwegian poet, novelist and children's writer
 Hans Olav Tungesvik (1936 in Skånevik – 2017) a Norwegian physician and politician 
 Osmund Kaldheim (born 1964) a businessman, civil servant and politician, grew up in Etne
 Ivar Bjørnson (born 1977 in Etne) composer and guitarist for the progressive black metal band Enslaved
 Anne Lise Frøkedal (born 1981 in Etne) stage name Frøkedal'' is a folk-pop, singer-songwriter

References

External links

Municipal fact sheet from Statistics Norway 
Pictures from Etne

 
Municipalities of Vestland
1838 establishments in Norway